RTÉ News and Current Affairs, also known as RTÉ News (Nuacht RTÉ), is the national news service provided by Irish public broadcaster Raidió Teilifís Éireann. Its services include local, national, European and international news, investigative journalism and current affairs programming for RTÉ television, radio, online, podcasts, on-demand and for independent Irish language public broadcaster TG4. It is the largest and most popular news source in Ireland – with 77% of the Irish public regarding it as their main source of both Irish and international news. It broadcasts in English, Irish and Irish Sign Language. The organisation is also a source of commentary on current affairs. The division is based at the RTÉ Television Centre in Donnybrook, Dublin; however, the station also operates regional bureaux across Ireland and the world.

History

Early history
On 1 January 1926, 2RN, Ireland's first radio station, began broadcasting. Its first advertised news bulletin was put out on 24 May 1926. Nine months later, on 26 February 1927, the station broadcast its first daily news report.

During the Second World War, referred to in Ireland as The Emergency, media censorship of radio broadcasts (under the provisions of the Emergency Powers Act 1939) affected news bulletins. Before any news bulletin was broadcast, the script of the bulletin was read over the phone to Head of the Government Information Bureau, Frank Gallagher. Censorship under the Act was lifted on 11 May 1945.

1960s
On 31 December 1961 Ireland's first national television station, Telefís Éireann, was officially launched. A new Television Complex was built at Donnybrook in Dublin and the news service was the first to move in. Charles Mitchel read the first television news bulletin, at 6:00 pm on 1 January 1962. Andy O'Mahony was the station's other chief newsreader in the early days of the new service. The new studios were still being completed, so construction work was heard during news bulletins. Later on Telefís Éireann's first full day of broadcasting Broadsheet made its debut. This programme provided a more detailed analysis of topical matters and current affairs. There was a mixture of incisive and light-hearted items, unscripted studio interviews and filmed reports. Presented by John O'Donoghue, Brian Cleeve and Brian Farrell, some of these men would continue broadcasting with the station until the new century. Telefís Éireann's first full day also saw the first broadcast of the Nine O'Clock News, a half-hour bulletin including news, newsview, weather, and sports results.

Broadsheet was broadcast for the last time in 1964. It was replaced by Frank Hall's Newsbeat, a news and current affairs programme that focused more on the light-hearted stories from around the country.

In 1966 Maurice O'Doherty joined the newsroom as a newsreader. Later that same year the station's new flagship news programme was broadcast for the first time. Seven Days had a production team with people such as Eoghan Harris, Brian Cleeve, Brian Farrell, and John O'Donoghue. In 1967 the programme merged with another, Division, and became 7 days.

The news was under the Telefís Éireann's (TÉ) news department, while public affairs came under TÉ's programming department. In the mid-60s three public affairs programmes emerged. Home Truths, a series to help people with consumer issues, 7 Days, a series that looked a political policy and Division a series of debates between government and opposition party leaders. Each would come under pressures due to various different groups, including government ministers.

Home Truths was successful in bring ordinary issues to the fore, in one instance a programme exposing meat prices caused butchers and the meat industry to protest the new TV service, this in turn caused issues for the advertising sales department who were having to deal with boycotts or changes to their advertising schedule, this in turn caused problems for producers who felt force to take on more softer issues due to TÉ's commercial concerns.

Division was produced to replace Party Political Broadcasts, it had been agreed with the main parties that TÉ would invite different politicians to discuss various issues, however even from the outset TÉ had to get the permission of the party's Chief Whip before allowing any local or national politician on to debate. However, when TÉ invited a Farming Representative into a debate with the Minister for Agriculture the Fianna Fail Chief Whip refused stating that the agreement was for politicians only.

Meanwhile, when TÉ attempted to send reporters to Vietnam for 7 Days they were advised by the Government that this was unnecessary, this view taken due to Ireland relationship with the United States. By the end of the 1960s, Home Truths and Division had been subsumed into 7days, while 7days was brought under the control of the News Division.

1970s & 1980s

When Radio Éireann and Telefís Éireann merged, RTÉ News was expanded, providing coverage to new stations RTÉ Raidió na Gaeltachta and RTÉ Radio 2.

In the 1970s News moved from the original Black and White picture format to color on television.

In the early 1980s, in the space of two years, there were three general elections. This demanded a larger schedule of current affairs. New programmes Morning Ireland and Today Tonight were launched.

The current set of TV News programmes began in 1988, as RTÉ re-aligned their programmes. Seán Duignan and Eileen Dunne were the first presenters of Six-One, which began in October 1988

1990s & 2000s

In 1991, RTÉ News appointed its first legal affairs correspondent, Kieron Wood. Also in the 1990s, the first Washington, D.C. correspondent Mark Little was appointed, and Teilifís na Gaeilge, RTÉ lyric fm and RTÉ.ie were established. In 1992 RTÉ launched its flagship current affairs programme Prime Time replacing Today Tonight. Other notable current affairs programmes from the 1990s include The Week in Politics & Oireachtas Report. Ed Mulhall became managing editor in the Newsroom Division in 1994, and was appointed managing director of RTÉ News and Current Affairs in 1997.

Much of RTÉ's News output remained the same throughout the start of the 21st Century. In 2003 RTÉ's news department was merged with its Current Affairs department to form RTÉ News and Current Affairs. Also in September 2003, all RTÉ news reports in English on all networks were rebranded to RTÉ News, ending the separate branding of News 2 and 2FM News. In December 2008, RTÉ News moved out of their usual studio 3 in the Television Centre at Donnybrook and moved into a temporary studio while work was carried out in studio 3 for the relaunch. The new look was unveiled at the One O'Clock news programme on Monday 9 February 2009. Due to RTÉ cutbacks, instead of using satellite, reporters on foreign assignments were asked to send reports by internet link. RTÉ's Beijing bureau was closed in June 2009. 2009 brought major changes the current affairs schedule with the axing of the long-running Questions and Answers which was replaced by The Frontline.

2010s & 2020s
The 2010s opened with what has since been commemorated as "one of the most memorable moments of Irish television" being shown on RTÉ's televised news bulletins; amid a deep freeze on 8 January 2010, RTÉ showed one male individual slipping and sliding down the street in Dublin.

On 3 April 2012, it was announced that Ed Mulhall had quit RTÉ News and Current Affairs.

On 24 October 2012, RTÉ News & Current Affairs announced some major changes to its output from 2013. Prime Time relaunched with a larger studio and additional presenters Claire Byrne and George Lee. The Frontline was also brought under the Prime Time brand with the programme now airing 3 times a week. In 2012, RTÉ announced it was moving some of its regional newsrooms to local Institute of Technology as a cost saving arrangement. The affected areas are Sligo, Dundalk, Galway, Athlone and Waterford. RTÉ will retain the Cork and Limerick bureaux.

In January 2013, RTÉ launched a morning news programme, Morning Edition, which aired weekdays between 09:00–11:00 on RTÉ One and RTÉ News Now. Morning Edition was cancelled in November 2014. The Week in Politics now airs twice every Sunday premiering live at 12:00 and repeated again at its usual late-night slot. Morning Ireland relaunched in 2013 in a new studio and continues to air both on RTÉ Radio 1 and RTÉ News Now.

RTÉ News and Current Affairs currently produces over 1,000 hours of television programming and 2,000 hours of radio programming a year.

On 26 April 2014, RTÉ News got a new look for all of its news programmes across RTÉ Television, with a tweaked logo, new opening & closing titles, new graphics, new backdrop in Studio 3 and a new arrangement of the 9 February 2009 news music. The new look was unveiled at the Six One news bulletin.

On 22 September 2014, RTÉ News on Two was dropped. It was replaced two new early evening bulletins called News Feed at 18:55 and 19:55. In January 2017 News Feed was also dropped. RTÉ2 does not provide any news service outside the children's programme news2day.

On 12 January 2015, RTÉ dropped the Monday night edition of Prime Time replaced by Claire Byrne Live.

On 27 October 2017, RTÉ launched its News Archives Collection not filled much after Christmas Eve 2020 (7 March 1985 – 31 December 1990). Plans to close the gaps on missing dates only 14 clips were filled between June 2021 and April 2022. But plans to upload film news (31 December 1961 – 6 March 1985) or (1991–1999) on video tape should be decided in late May or early June 2022 via RTÉ Archives.

In the summer of 2018, RTÉ announced their plan to refurbish and overhaul their news output in early 2019. RTÉ confirmed that they would be putting out to tender a contract worth close to €1.7 million to refurbish and renovate their news studio "Studio 3" at RTÉ Television Centre in Dublin. The overhaul would see the studio being redesigned, with a smaller news desk area and a larger second presentation area, along with new lighting, graphics, music and presentation.

On 15 December 2018, RTÉ News moved out of Studio 3 into a temporary studio (Studio 2) at the television centre. Work then commenced on refurbishing and overhauling Studio 3.

The refurbished Studio 3 of RTÉ was relaunched on 28 January 2019. Jon Williams, RTÉ News & Current Affairs Managing Director, said: "The new studio and design builds on the themes that have made RTÉ Ireland’s number one choice for TV News – bringing our audiences stories from across the world and around the corner.I’m particularly thrilled that "O’Donnell Abú" will again herald the news of the day – and grateful to the RTÉ National Symphony Orchestra for their interpretation of an iconic piece of music. The star of the news is the news – and I'm delighted that the audiences to RTÉ News will reap a dividend from last year's land sale."

On 30 May 2022, Claire Byrne Live was axed after 7 years.

Programming

RTÉ News and Current Affairs is responsible for all the news bulletins on RTÉ One, TG4, RTÉ Radio 1, RTÉ 2fm, RTÉ lyric fm, RTÉ News Now, RTÉ Raidió na Gaeltachta, and RTÉ Europe. The division also provides written news updates on RTÉ's teletext service, Aertel, RTÉ Mobile and RTÉ.ie. General news bulletins on TV and radio are usually branded as RTÉ News.

RTÉ News faces competition from within Ireland and abroad. For local news Virgin Media News provides competition in the television sector; as do Newstalk, Today FM and 4fm in the radio sector. As Ireland is a predominantly English-speaking nation, international news channels (CNBC Europe, CNN International, EuroNews, France 24, BBC News, Sky News, etc.) compete with RTÉ with regards television news coverage of international events. Despite this competition, however, RTÉ News remains the most popular source of news in Ireland.

Television programmes
RTÉ News and Current Affairs television programmes include:

English-language

Former TV programmes 

One To One
Oireachtas Report
RTÉ News: Headlines (RTÉ One mid-morning, afternoon and late night bulletins) 
RTÉ News on Two
Special News Programmes
The department also broadcasts numerous special programmes throughout the year. RTÉ has comprehensively covered every general & local election in Ireland since it was established. RTÉ has also covered some international elections such as elections for the Northern Ireland Assembly and Westminster as well as the US Presidential Election. Each year the Budget is covered with the budget delivery & analysis given on RTÉ One with RTÉ Two covering the live budget debate from Dáil Éireann. On occasion RTÉ may also provide rolling news coverage on an important developing news story such as on 9/11, the London Bombings of 2005 & events in Ireland such as the Dublin riots of 2006. Schedules are usually interrupted on RTÉ One to provide details of breaking stories.

Irish-language
On RTÉ One
Nuacht RTÉ

On TG4
Nuacht TG4
Timpeall na Tíre
7 Lá

Irish Sign Language
RTÉ News with Signing
Cinnlinte Nuachta until 2009.

Weather forecasts
Weather forecasts are provided by Met Éireann developed and presented largely by a team of meteorologists and specially trained weather presenters. 
The first televised weather forecast occurred on 31 December 1961.

RTÉ Weather provides regional, national, European and world weather reports. Special weather reports occur during significant weather events and specialist reports during the European ski season and reports for warmer climates during the winter season. Weather reports are in Irish, Irish Sign Language, and English.

Weather reports are also supplied for radio, online and on the RTÉ Player.

Radio

RTÉ News and Current Affairs radio programmes include:

English-language
Morning Ireland
RTÉ News at One
Drivetime
World Report
This Week
News bulletins on the hour on RTÉ Radio 1 
News bulletins on the hour on RTÉ 2fm from 7am until 7pm, sport only bulletins from 8pm until 12am.
News bulletins on the half-hour on RTÉ Lyric fm.

Irish-language
Adhmhaidin
Nuacht a hAon
Nuacht a Sé
Regular Irish-language news bulletins on RTÉ Radio 1, RTÉ 2fm and RTÉ Raidió na Gaeltachta.

Online

Launched in May 1996; RTÉ News content is also available worldwide on the internet at rté.ie/news. The website provides news content in visual, audio and written formats. Users have the opportunity to stream previous news broadcasts from both TV and radio. Archived material is available through RTÉ Archive. Content is also made available through social media such as Facebook, Instagram, and Twitter. RTÉ News also produces an app which features breaking news content among other news content.

RTÉ News channel

Since 12 June 2008, RTÉ News has been served by the RTÉ News channel, formerly RTÉ News Now. The channel airs commercial-free 24 hours a day with the latest live news. The station was initially made available on mobile phones and online at rte.ie/news. The channel broadcasts in the Irish, English and ISL languages. The channel is also available on Saorview (channel 6), Sky channel 578, Eir channel 200, Virgin Media channel 200, mobile phone service providers such as O2 Ireland, Vodafone Ireland and Android. The channel also provides a free service to users of iPhone, iPod Touch and iPad. The channel was available on train services within Dublin city and surrounding regions under a special agreement between Irish Rail, Transvision and RTÉ. Previously, Sky News provided such a service. The channel was rebranded from RTÉ News Now to RTÉ News channel in August 2020 with minor changes to its programming line-up.

Bureaux
RTÉ have studios and offices in the following locations:

Regional

Athlone
Baile na nGall
Belfast
Castlebar
Cork
Derry
Dublin
Dundalk
Galway
Letterkenny
Limerick
Sligo
Waterford

International

Beijing (closed following the 2008 Beijing Olympics and reopened in 2019 with Yvonne Murray)
Brussels
London
Washington D.C.

Notable staff past and present

Nuacht RTÉ newsreaders include:
 Siun Nic Gearailt
 Eimear Ní Chonaola

Reporters

Regional

Northern Ireland
Vincent Kearney (Northern editor)
Conor Macauley (Northern correspondent)

Dublin 
Vacant (Dublin correspondent)

North East
Laura Hogan (North East correspondent)

North West
Eileen Magnier (North West correspondent)

West
Pat McGrath (Western correspondent)
Teresa Mannion (Regional reporter)

Mid West
Cathy Halloran (Mid West correspondent)

Midlands
Sinéad Hussey (Midlands correspondent)

South East
Conor Kane (South East correspondent)

South
Paschal Sheehy (Southern editor)
Jennie O'Sullivan (Reporter)
Seán Mac an tSíthigh (Reporter)

International

Tony Connelly (Europe editor)
Liam Nolan (Eastern Europe reporter)
Seán Whelan (Washington correspondent)
John Kilraine (London correspondent)
Kagweni Micheni (Africa reporter)
Eimear Lowe (Foreign editor)
Vacant (Deputy Foreign editor)
Eleanor Burnhill (Foreign reporter)
Jackie Fox (Foreign reporter)
Dimitri O'Donnell (London reporter)
Yvonne Murray (Global Security reporter)

Specialist correspondents and editors
Politics

Paul Cunningham (Correspondent)
Micheál Lehane (Correspondent)
Mary Regan (Reporter)
Aisling Kenny (Reporter)
Sandra Hurley (Reporter)
David Murphy (Political coverage editor)
Robert Shortt (Economics)
Vivienne Traynor (Courts reporter)
Orla O'Donnell (Legal Affairs)
Brian O'Donovan (Work and Technology)
Fergal Bowers (Health)
Paul Reynolds (Crime)
Will Goodbody (Business)
George Lee (Environment)
Joe Mag Raollaigh (Agriculture and Consumer Affairs)
Ailbhe Conneely (Social Affairs and Religion)
Emma O'Kelly (Education)
Sinéad Crowley (Arts and Media)

Former newsreaders

Don Cockburn
Peter Collins
Richard Crowley
Derek Davis
Bryan Dobson
Anne Doyle
Seán Duignan
Eileen Dunne 
John Finnerty
Noel Fogarty, sacked in September 2021
Jimmy Greeley
Mary Kennedy
Éamonn Lawlor
Flor McCarthy
Aengus Mac Grianna
Geraldine McInerney
Charles Mitchel
Michael Murphy
Colm Murray
Maurice O'Doherty
Una O'Hagan
Andy O'Mahony
Deirdre Purcell
Keelin Shanley
Kate Smith (later UTV)
Fionnuala Sweeney
Terry Wogan
Vere Wynne-Jones

Former reporters and correspondents

Charlie Bird (Chief News correspondent)
Úna Claffey (Political correspondent)
Carole Coleman (Washington correspondent), current reporter
David Davin-Power (Political correspondent)
Jim Dougal (Northern editor)
Jim Fahy (Western editor)
Martina Fitzgerald (Political correspondent)
Tommie Gorman (Northern editor)
Orla Guerin (former Europe correspondent) (later BBC)
Fergal Keane (former Northern Ireland correspondent) (later BBC)
Joe Little (Religious and Social Affairs correspondent)
Mark Little (Washington correspondent & Prime Time presenter)
David McCullagh (Political correspondent), current Six One presenter
Ingrid Miley (Industry and Employment correspondent)
Ciaran Mullooly (Midlands correspondent)
Michael Ryan (South East correspondent) (later presenter of Nationwide)
Margaret Ward (Foreign Editor, China correspondent)
Mary Wilson (Legal Affairs correspondent), current Drivetime presenter

Weather forecasters

European and worldwide

Karina Buckley
Nuala Carey
Helen Curran
Stephen Daly
Bonnie Diamond
Louise Heraghty
Trevor Keegan
Audrey McGrath
Tristan Rosenstock

Met Éireann

Elizabeth Coleman
Michelle Dillon
Mark Bowe
Joanna Donnelly
Linda Hughes
Gerry Murphy
Siobhán Ryan

Former weather forecasters

Met Éireann

Joan Blackburn
Jean Byrne
Michael Cleary
Evelyn Cusack
John Doyle
Rhoda Draper
John Eagleton
Gerald Fleming
Michael Gilligan
Paddy MacHugh
Danny McNally
Seamus Miller
Evelyn Murphy
Dr. Aidan Nulty
Vincent O'Shea
Jerry Scully
Austin Woods

Controversies

In March 2009, RTÉ was involved in controversy over a report about the placing of naked paintings of Taoiseach Brian Cowen in two Dublin Art Galleries. Initially, the station carried a television news report that displayed the pictures and treated the topic in a humorous light. However, after complaints from within the governing Fianna Fáil party, the station aired an apology to the Taoiseach.

In May 2011, RTÉ broadcast on a Prime Time Investigates programme allegations that the Roman Catholic Priest Kevin Reynolds raped and impregnated a Kenyan teenager. A scandal ensued when the allegations were discovered to be false, which generated intensive media coverage and political debate in Ireland, resulting in a government inquiry into the broadcaster.

In November 2020, during the COVID-19 pandemic, RTÉ apologised after several top news presenters and correspondents, including Bryan Dobson, David McCullagh, Miriam O'Callaghan, Eileen Dunne and Paul Cunningham, were photographed at a retirement party at RTÉ headquarters where social distancing was not fully observed. Taoiseach Micheál Martin described the photographs as "very disappointing". A month later, a health and safety review conducted by RTÉ into the gathering found that five breaches of COVID-19 protocols occurred, with up to 40 people present at the time.

References

External links
 
 RTÉ Live
 RTÉ News Now

RTÉ News and Current Affairs
Irish television news shows
Radio in the Republic of Ireland